Grady Judd (born March 10, 1954) is the sheriff of Polk County, Florida. He has served in this position since 2005.

Early life and education 

Grady Judd was born in Lakeland, Florida, in 1954. He earned both bachelor's and master's degrees from Rollins College, and graduated from the FBI National Academy. He was awarded two honorary doctorates. Webber International University presented Judd with an Honorary Doctorate of Business in 2015, and Warner University presented him with an Honorary Doctorate of Humane Studies in 2020.

Career 
Judd started working for the Polk County Sheriff's Office (PCSO) in 1972 as a dispatcher. As the first employee under the age of 21 in the department, he was required to get his father to purchase his ammunition. At the age of 27, he attained the rank of captain, supervising 44 employees, all of whom were older than he. He was elected as the sheriff of Polk County in 2004, and re-elected in 2008, 2012, and 2016.  In the 2020 election campaign, Judd ran unopposed. Judd served as an adjunct professor at the University of South Florida and Florida Southern College.

Judd served as president of the Florida Sheriffs Association (2013–2014) and president of the Major County Sheriffs of America (2018–2019). He is a commissioner on the Marjory Stoneman Douglas High School Public Safety Commission. Judd served as an active member of the Bartow Rotary Club since 1994, and was a member of the Board of Directors for the club from 1996–1999.

Judd gained publicity as a sheriff with his "tell it how it is" demeanor. In 2006, after a traffic stop resulted in a deputy and his K-9 dog shot and killed, deputies shot and killed the suspect, shooting him 68 times. Asked by a reporter about the number of shots, Judd responded, "That's all the bullets we had, or we would have shot him more."

In 2020, Judd was appointed by U.S. President Donald Trump to serve a three-year term on the Coordinating Council on Juvenile Justice and Delinquency Prevention.

While the Office of Sheriff in Polk County is non-partisan, Judd frequently endorses Republican political candidates. In a 2022 news conference, Judd referred to Republican Florida Governor Ron DeSantis as the "greatest governor in the United States of America."

Elections

2004 
Judd was elected Sheriff of Polk County in his first run for public office. Judd received 64% of the vote in a three-way non-partisan race against attorney and former FBI Special Agent Kirk Warren (20%) and Polk deputy Pete Karashay (16%).

Judd was preceded in office by Lawrence W. Crow, Jr. who served 17 years as Sheriff and declined to run in 2004. Crow was appointed by Governor Bob Martinez in 1987 and served until Judd was sworn into office.

2008 
Judd was re-elected by defeating write-in candidate Michael Lashman. Judd received 96% of the vote; Lashman received just under 4%.

2012 
Judd again faced write-in candidate Michael Lashman, a flooring contractor from Lakeland, in his third campaign for Sheriff. Judd again won with 96% of the vote, with 215,320 votes.

2016 
Judd ran for a fourth term of office in 2016 and was elected with 95.3% of the vote compared to 4.7% for write-in ballots.

2020 
Judd ran for a fifth term of office in 2020 and was reelected unopposed, making Judd the first Sheriff in Polk’s 160-year history to be elected to 5 terms.

Professional affiliations 
Sheriff Judd was elected President of the Florida Sheriffs Association in 2013. Prior to that, he served as chair for the FSA Board of Directors and held the positions of treasurer, secretary, and vice president. In 2018, Judd was sworn in as President of the Major County Sheriffs of America for a two-year term, and is now a member of the Executive Board as immediate past president. In 2019, Judd was appointed by the National Sheriffs' Association to serve on the School Safety and Security Committee.

Career Highlights

Operation Swipe Left for Meth 
Sheriff Judd was featured on The News with Shepard Smith where he detailed a six-month undercover drug investigation that identified 68 people who conducted drug sales on three social media and mobile dating apps: Grindr, Scruff, and Taimi. At the time the segment aired (January 27, 2022), 60 people were arrested; the other 8 were wanted on Polk County Sheriff’s Office arrest warrants.

MCSA Sheriff of the Year 
Sheriff Judd was the first recipient of the inaugural "Sandra S. Hutchens Sheriff of the Year" award, presented by the Major County Sheriffs of America in February 2022 at the MCSA 2022 Winter Conference. The award was given to Sheriff Judd in praise of his "steady leadership, mentorship, and friendship at the helm of MCSA [which] gave this association a visionary foundation for growth to ‘Lead the Way’ in the profession of law enforcement.” The MCSA, established in 1998, is a professional law enforcement association of the 113 largest sheriff's offices representing counties or parishes with a population of 500,000 or more.

50 Years of Service 
Sheriff Judd was featured in a PoliceOne article, America’s favorite sheriff talks about cops, criminals and his 50-year career where he shared about serving the Polk County Sheriff's Office and the citizens of Polk County during his career spanning 50 years.

References

External links 
 Polk County Sheriff's Office

Living people
1954 births
FBI National Academy graduates
Florida sheriffs
People from Lakeland, Florida